Ernest Mtawali, also known as Ernest Chirwali, (born October 10, 1966) is a retired Malawian football (soccer) midfielder.

Mtawali initially played for Hardware Stars in his home country. In South Africa he played for Welkom Real Hearts, Bloemfontein Celtic, Sundowns FC, Orlando Pirates, Hellenic FC and Ajax Cape Town. He also had stints with Newell's Old Boys in Argentina, Toulouse FC in France, Al-Wehda in Saudi Arabia and also represented his country's national team.

He is also reported to have played in the Italian third division, under a false name in order to evade a FIFA ban on players who had played in Apartheid-era South Africa.

He was appointed as caretaker manager of the Malawi national team in June 2015.

References

1966 births
Living people
Malawian footballers
Malawian expatriate footballers
Malawi international footballers
Expatriate soccer players in South Africa
Association football midfielders
Malawian expatriate sportspeople in South Africa
Al-Wehda Club (Mecca) players
Hellenic F.C. players
Cape Town Spurs F.C. players
Toulouse FC players
Ligue 1 players
Orlando Pirates F.C. players
Bloemfontein Celtic F.C. players
Mamelodi Sundowns F.C. players
Newell's Old Boys footballers
Expatriate footballers in France
Expatriate footballers in Saudi Arabia
Expatriate footballers in Argentina